Wagon Team is a 1952 American Western film directed by George Archainbaud and written by Gerald Geraghty. The film stars Gene Autry, Gail Davis, Dick Jones, Gordon Jones, Harry Harvey Sr. and Henry Rowland. The film was released on September 30, 1952, by Columbia Pictures.

Plot

Cast
Gene Autry as Gene Autry
Gail Davis as Connie Weldon
Dick Jones as Dave Weldon aka The Apache Kid
Gordon Jones as Marshal Sam Taplin
Harry Harvey Sr. as Doc Weldon
Henry Rowland as Mike McClure
George J. Lewis as Carlos de la Torre
John Cason as Slim
Pat Buttram as Deputy Pat Buttram
Champion as Champ

References

External links
 

1952 films
American Western (genre) films
1952 Western (genre) films
Columbia Pictures films
Films directed by George Archainbaud
American black-and-white films
1950s English-language films
1950s American films